= Lakyawn =

Lakyawn may refer to either of two Burmese villages:

- Lakyawn, Chipw
- Lakyawn, Hsawlaw
